The Visitors is the eighth studio album by Swedish pop group ABBA. It was released on 30 November 1981.

With The Visitors, ABBA took several steps away from the "lighter" pop music they had recorded previously and the album is often regarded as a more complex and mature effort.  The opening track, "The Visitors", with its ominous synthesizer sounds and the distinctive lead vocal by Frida, announced a change in musical style.  With Benny and Frida going their separate ways, the pain of splitting up was explored yet again in "When All Is Said and Done".  The major hit single on the album, "One of Us", also depicted the end of a love story.  Elsewhere there were Cold War themes—highly topical at the time—and further songs of isolation and regret.

The Visitors was one of the first records ever to be digitally recorded  and mixed, as well as one of the earliest in history to be pressed on the CD format in 1982 (in terms of commercial release dates, it was predated by the Japanese release of Billy Joel's 52nd Street.) The Visitors has been reissued in digitally remastered form four times—first in 1997, then in 2001, again in 2005 as part of The Complete Studio Recordings box set and most recently in 2012.

The Visitors Deluxe Edition was released on 23 April 2012.  As with previous releases in the Deluxe Edition series, this version offered a DVD of archive material along with CD bonus tracks – including the demo medley "From a Twinkling Star to a Passing Angel", the first previously-unreleased ABBA recordings since 1994.

For four decades, The Visitors stood as ABBA's final studio album, until the release of their 2021 album, Voyage.

Recording and release
Recording began on what was to become ABBA's eighth studio album on 16 March 1981. By this time, tensions in ABBA had heightened. Björn Ulvaeus and Agnetha Fältskog had divorced in July 1980, while the band's other couple, Benny Andersson and Anni-Frid Lyngstad, announced their divorce in February 1981, adding strain to the musical partnership. Ulvaeus mentioned in retrospect that the sessions were troubled, noting, "It could be frosty sometimes." Lyngstad also commented that they were beginning to tire of working together.

The members of ABBA and their personnel have memories of the recording sessions for this album being rather difficult. To begin with, their sound engineer Michael Tretow had to become accustomed to using the new 32-track digital recorder that had been purchased for Polar Music Studios. He said, "Digital recording...cut out all the hiss, but it also meant that sounds were sharply cut off below a certain level. The sound simply became too clean, so I had to find ways of compensating for that."  The first three tracks for the album had already been recorded using analogue tape and therefore Tretow had to transfer all subsequent tracks from digital to analogue and back again to avoid a difference in quality.
 
On its release, The Visitors reached the top of the charts in a number of territories but was not as successful as their previous albums.

The Visitors was released as a Deluxe Edition in April 2012. As with previous releases in the Deluxe Edition series, this version offered a DVD of archive material along with a CD featuring the original album (although a different mix of "Head Over Heels" was used) and bonus tracks; one of the bonus tracks included was the demo medley "From a Twinkling Star to a Passing Angel", the first previously unreleased ABBA recordings since 1994. Pitchfork gave it an 8.6 grade, saying "even as the band's commercial star faded and its professional relationships quietly unravelled, they were perfectionists. ABBA's music on The Visitors is more pristine and ambitious than it had ever been, its themes darker, its personal politics more tangled." The Arts Desk: "The Visitors is not their best, but it is their most interesting [album], pointing to where Björn Ulvaeus and Benny Andersson would go next."

Album cover

Rune Söderqvist designed the cover and photographed the group in a room containing Julius Kronberg's painting of Eros. The room is the Atelje Studio in Skansen Park, Stockholm. The group are positioned apart and appear to be waiting solemnly in the shadows.

Track listing
Source: 
All tracks written by Benny Andersson and Björn Ulvaeus.

Personnel
ABBA

Agnetha Fältskog – vocals
Anni-Frid Lyngstad – vocals
Björn Ulvaeus – acoustic guitar, guitar, mandolin, vocals
Benny Andersson – synthesizers, keyboards, vocals

Additional personnel
Ola Brunkert – drums
Rutger Gunnarsson – bass, mandolin
Janne Kling – flute and clarinet
Per Lindvall – drums (on "Soldiers" and "The Visitors")
Åke Sundqvist – percussion
Lasse Wellander – acoustic guitar, electric guitar, mandolin

Production
Producers: Benny Andersson, Björn Ulvaeus
Arrangers: Benny Andersson, Björn Ulvaeus
Engineer: Michael B. Tretow
Design: Rune Söderqvist
Remastered for the 1997 Remasters by Jon Astley and Tim Young with Michael B. Tretow
Remastered for the 2001 Remasters by Jon Astley with Michael B. Tretow
Remastered for the 2005 Complete Studio Recordings Box Set by Henrik Jonsson

Charts

Weekly charts

Year-end charts

Certifications and sales

References

External links

The Visitors (Adobe Flash) at Radio3Net (streamed copy where licensed)

ABBA albums
1981 albums
Polar Music albums
Albums recorded at Polar Studios
Albums produced by Björn Ulvaeus
Albums produced by Benny Andersson
Atlantic Records albums
Epic Records albums